Tridentea is a genus of succulent plant in the family Apocynaceae, endemic to southern Africa.

Name and history

Tridentea was first described as a genus in 1812, and its name refers to the three "teeth" on each interstaminal segment of its flower ("tri-" = three; "dentis" = teeth). It was subsequently split, and the genus Tromotriche was created for the ten species which were separated.

Description

Vegetative features
Tridentea stems are typically smooth, soft and appear as roughly four-edged in cross section. The four angles are marked by rows of low tubercle mounds. In young growth, each tubercle bears a small splayed leaf-remnant. These fall off with time though. Each leaf remnant is always surrounded by several minute, fat hairs.

Floral features
Tridentea flowers are flattened, star-shaped, and usually brightly coloured. The most common colouring is a mixed mottling of greenish-yellow with purple. Their inside is usually densely papillate. Flowers appear on minute inflorescences, and each stem bears only one inflorescence, from the stem base.

Species

formerly included
Tridentea baylissii, syn of Tromotriche baylissii

References

 
Apocynaceae genera
Flora of Southern Africa
Taxonomy articles created by Polbot